Mbore (Borei, Mborei) a.k.a. Gamei (Gamai) is a Lower Ramu language of Papua New Guinea. It is spoken in the villages of Gamei and Boroi in Yawar Rural LLG, Bogia District, Madang Province.

Its closest relatives are the Watam and Kaian languages, both of which lie upriver from Kopar, a village situated at the mouth of the Sepik River.

References

Ottilien languages
Languages of Madang Province